J. J. Jones or JJ Jones may refer to:
 J. J. Jones (linebacker) (born 1978), NFL linebacker
 J. J. Jones (quarterback) (1952–2009), New York Jets NFL quarterback
 J. J. Jones (wide receiver) (born 1992), NFL wide receiver
 JJ Jones (Skins), a fictional character in the British teen drama Skins

See also
List of people with surname Jones